Child Okeford (sometimes written Childe Okeford) is a village and civil parish in the county of Dorset in southern England,  east of the small town of Sturminster Newton in the North Dorset administrative district. Child Okeford lies downstream from Sturminster, along the River Stour, which passes half a mile west of the village. In the 2011 census the civil parish had a population of 1,114.

History

On Hambledon Hill to the east of the village are a Neolithic ceremonial burial site and an Iron Age hill fort. The latter has multiple ramparts enclosing  and is rich in occupation remains. It occupies the entire northern spur of the hill above  and has been described as "one of the most impressive earthworks in southern England".

In the Domesday Book of 1086 Child Okeford was recorded as Acford and appears in two entries. It had 39 households and a total taxable value of 10 geld units. By 1227 the village was known as Childacford. The village's name derives from the Old English cild, meaning a noble-born son, plus ac and ford, also Old English, meaning an oak-tree ford. The noble-born son likely referred to an early owner.

In 1645 Hambledon Hill was the site of a battle in the English Civil War; a group of locals, who were antagonistic to the war and called themselves "the Clubmen", attacked both Royalist and Parliamentarian forces and petitioned them to end the war. Under the leadership of the rector of nearby Compton Abbas, 2,000 of them assembled on the hill and defied Oliver Cromwell's requests to lay down their arms. Cromwell sent in troops and defeated them, then locked up 300 prisoners in the church at Iwerne Courtney and extracted promises of good behaviour. Cromwell wrote of them as being "poor silly creatures" who "promise to be very dutiful for time to come". A century later General James Wolfe used the hill's steeper sides to prepare his troops; they later surprised the French at Quebec by scaling the Plains of Abraham under cover of darkness.

A World War I war memorial in the form of a stone cross stands at the road junction known in the village as The Cross.

The Somerset and Dorset Railway ran to the west of the village, through neighbouring Shillingstone, until the line closed in 1966 under the Beeching cuts. The Shillingstone Station, however, is being refurbished under the Shillingstone Station Project.

Geography

The underlying geology is Kimmeridge clay, upper and lower greensand, gault, some chalk in the east and river gravels by the River Stour.

Demography

In the 2011 census Child Okeford civil parish had 533 dwellings, 503 households and a population of 1,114.

The population of the parish in the censuses between 1921 and 2001 is shown in the table below:

Amenities

Child Okeford has a village hall, community centre, playing field (including a football pitch and cricket pitch), doctor's surgery, post office and general store, Church of England primary school, and a nursery or educational support centre for children age 0–11 years. Advert - Gold Hill Farm is an organic farm that also houses an organic food shop, a café, an artist, a glass blower, a cheese maker and a dog groomer.

Notable residents

In 1561 William Kethe was appointed vicar of the parish. He remained in the village until his death in 1594. Kethe wrote the hymns O worship the King, all glorious above and All people that on earth do dwell, the latter adapted from Psalm 100 and set to the tune of The Old Hundredth. Other well known people who live or lived in the village include the composer Sir John Tavener, who lived in the village until his death in 2013, TV presenter Harry Corbett, originator of Sooty and Sweep, who lived here until his death in 1989, TV presenter Mick Robertson, known for Magpie, politician David James, who lived in the village whilst Conservative MP for North Dorset, and actor Tom Mennard, known for the character Sam Tindall in Coronation Street.

Gallery

References

Further reading
 Knight, Peter, Ancient Stones of Dorset, 1998.

External links 

Villages in Dorset